The Mark 50 torpedo is a U.S. Navy advanced lightweight torpedo for use against fast, deep-diving submarines. The Mk 50 can be launched from all anti-submarine aircraft and from torpedo tubes aboard surface combatant ships. The Mk 50 was intended to replace the Mk 46 as the fleet's lightweight torpedo.  Instead the Mark 46 will be replaced with the Mark 54 LHT.

The torpedo's stored chemical energy propulsion system uses a small tank of sulfur hexafluoride gas, which is sprayed over a block of solid lithium, which generates enormous quantities of heat, which generates steam. The steam propels the torpedo in a closed Rankine cycle, supplying power to a pump-jet. This propulsion system offers the very important deep-water performance advantage in that the combustion products—sulfur and lithium fluoride—occupy less volume than the reactants, so the torpedo does not have to force these out against increasing water pressure as it approaches a deep-diving submarine.

General characteristics, Mk 50

Primary function: air and ship-launched lightweight torpedo
Contractor: Alliant Techsystems, Westinghouse
Length: 
Weight: approx. 
Diameter: 
Speed: > 
Power Plant: Stored Chemical Energy Propulsion System
Propulsion: Pump Jet
Guidance system: Active/passive acoustic homing

Comparable weapons
Stingray torpedo
MU90 Impact

Notes

References
MK-50 Advanced Lightweight Torpedo via FAS
USA Torpedoes since World War II - navweaps.com
Issues Related to the Navy's Mark-50 Torpedo Propulsion System, General Accounting Office, January 1989 - has diagrams showing internal general arrangement, retrieved December 18, 2012

Aerial torpedoes
Torpedoes of the United States
Military equipment introduced in the 1990s